Thomas Walter J. Wilcox (1879–1962) was a professional footballer who played for Norwich City, Blackpool, Manchester United, Huddersfield Town and Carlisle United.

References

1879 births
1962 deaths
People born at sea
English footballers
Association football goalkeepers
Millwall F.C. players
Cray Wanderers F.C. players
Arsenal F.C. players
Norwich City F.C. players
Blackpool F.C. players
Manchester United F.C. players
Carlisle United F.C. players
Huddersfield Town A.F.C. players
Goole Town F.C. players
English Football League players